The 2000–01 Polish Volleyball League was the 65th season of the Polish Volleyball Championship, the 1st season as a professional league organized by the Professional Volleyball League SA under the supervision of the Polish Volleyball Federation.

Mostostal Azoty Kędzierzyn-Koźle achieved their 3rd title of the Polish Champions.

Regular season

Playoffs
(to 3 victories)

Final standings

External links
 Official website 

Polish Volleyball League
Polish Volleyball League
Polish Volleyball League
Polish Volleyball League